Luke Daniel Sanders (born December 12, 1985) is a retired American mixed martial artist who competed in the Bantamweight division. A professional competitor since 2011, he also competed for the Ultimate Fighting Championship (UFC), Strikeforce and the RFA.

Background
Born in Brenham, Texas and raised in Nashville, Tennessee, Sanders was athletic from a young age; he won national titles in BMX and finished fourth at the grand nationals event in 1992 at the age of seven. He started wrestling in the second grade, winning a state championship for Montgomery Central High School in 2004 at 145 lbs. Sanders also played hockey, winning two state championships in 2001 and 2002. He began competing in Toughman contests at the age of 17, winning several tournaments, and holds an amateur boxing record of 9–0.

Mixed martial arts career

Early career
Sanders compiled an amateur record of 4-0 before making his professional debut for Strikeforce in 2011. Sanders won via TKO in the first round. He then continued his unbeaten streak, compiling a record of 10-0 before being signed by the UFC.

Ultimate Fighting Championship
Sanders made his promotional debut as a short notice injury replacement on January 17, 2016, against Maximo Blanco at UFC Fight Night 81. He won the fight via submission in the first round and was awarded a Performance of the Night bonus.

Sanders next faced Iuri Alcântara on March 4, 2017, at UFC 209. He was handed his first professional loss via submission (kneebar) in the second round.

Sanders was scheduled to face Felipe Arantes on September 16, 2017, at UFC Fight Night 116. However, the fight was scrapped after Arantes fell sick on September 14 from an undisclosed illness.

Sanders was expected to face Bryan Caraway on December 9, 2017, at UFC Fight Night 123. However, on November 20, Caraway pulled out from the fight with undisclosed reason and he was replaced by Andre Soukhamthath. Sanders lost the fight via TKO in the second round. California State Athletic Commission (CSAC) flagged Sanders, after the event, of gaining more than 10% of weight from weight-in weight against on fight day weight, from 135.6 Ibs to 154.5 Ibs, which well over the commission regulation contracted weight of staying within 10% body weight gain for CSAC would not license to Sanders to fight in bantamweight bout in California.

Sanders faced Patrick Williams on April 14, 2018, at UFC on Fox 29. Despite knocking Williams down in the first round, Sanders went on to win the fight via unanimous decision. The bout marked the last of Sanders' prevailing contract and after entertaining other offers, he opted to re-sign with the UFC.

Sanders faced Rani Yahya on August 25, 2018, at UFC Fight Night 135. He lost the fight via heel hook submission in the first round.

Sanders faced Renan Barão on February 17, 2018, at UFC on ESPN 1. At the weigh-ins, Barão weighed in at 138 pounds, 2 pounds over the Bantamweight non-title fight upper limit of 136 lbs. As a result, the bout proceeded at catchweight and  Barão was fined 20% of his purse which went to Sanders. Sanders won the fight via knockout in the second round. This fight earned him the Performance of the Night award.

Sanders was scheduled to face Chris Gutiérrez on August 1, 2020, at UFC Fight Night: Brunson vs. Shahbazyan. However, Sanders was removed from the bout in mid-July for undisclosed reasons and replaced by promotional newcomer Cody Durden.

Sanders faced Nate Maness on November 28, 2020, at UFC on ESPN: Blaydes vs. Lewis. He lost the fight via second round submission.

Sanders was initially scheduled to face Damon Jackson on May 1, 2021, at UFC on ESPN: Reyes vs. Procházka. However, Jackson withdrew from the bout and was replaced by Felipe Colares – whose opponent also withdrew from the event – in a featherweight bout. Despite knocking Colares down multiple times in the first round, Sanders lost the bout via unanimous decision. The bout was the last of his prevailing contract and it was not renewed, making Sanders a free agent.

On May 8, 2021, It was announced that Sanders has retired from mixed martial arts.

Personal life
Sanders has a daughter Riley from his previous relationship and a son Jagger (born 2020).

Championships and accomplishments
Ultimate Fighting Championship
Performance of the Night (Two times) vs. Maximo Blanco & Renan Barão
Resurrection Fighting Alliance
RFA Bantamweight Championship (One time; former)
One successful title defense

Mixed martial arts record

|-
|Loss
|align=center|13–5
|Felipe Colares
|Decision (unanimous)
|UFC on ESPN: Reyes vs. Procházka
|
|align=center|3
|align=center|5:00
|Las Vegas, Nevada, United States
|
|-
|Loss
|align=center|13–4
|Nate Maness
|Submission (rear-naked choke)
|UFC on ESPN: Smith vs. Clark
|
|align=center|2
|align=center|2:29
|Las Vegas, Nevada, United States
|
|-
|Win
|align=center|13–3
|Renan Barão
|KO (punches)
|UFC on ESPN: Ngannou vs. Velasquez 
|
|align=center|2
|align=center|1:01
|Phoenix, Arizona, United States
|
|-
|Loss
|align=center|12–3
|Rani Yahya
|Submission (heel hook)
|UFC Fight Night: Gaethje vs. Vick 
|
|align=center|1
|align=center|1:31
|Lincoln, Nebraska, United States
|
|-
|Win
|align=center|12–2
|Patrick Williams
|Decision (unanimous)
|UFC on Fox: Poirier vs. Gaethje
|
|align=center|3
|align=center|5:00
|Glendale, Arizona, United States
|
|-
|Loss
|align=center|11–2
|Andre Soukhamthath
|TKO (punches)
|UFC Fight Night: Swanson vs. Ortega 
|
|align=center|2
|align=center|1:06
|Fresno, California, United States
|
|-
|Loss
|align=center|11–1
|Iuri Alcântara
|Submission (kneebar)
|UFC 209
|
|align=center|2
|align=center|3:13
|Las Vegas, Nevada, United States
|
|-
|Win
|align=center|11–0
|Maximo Blanco
|Submission (rear-naked choke)
|UFC Fight Night: Dillashaw vs. Cruz
|
|align=center| 1
|align=center| 3:38
|Boston, Massachusetts, United States
|
|-
|Win
|align=center|10–0
|Terrion Ware
|Decision (unanimous)
|AXS TV Fights: RFA vs. Legacy FC
|
|align=center|5
|align=center|5:00
|Robinsonville, Mississippi, United States
|
|-
|Win
|align=center|9–0
|Jarred Mercado
|TKO (knee and punches)
|RFA 20
|
|align=center|1
|align=center|1:06
|Broomfield, Colorado, United States
|
|-
|Win
|align=center|8–0
|Darrick Minner
|TKO (punches)
|RFA 17
|
|align=center|2
|align=center|3:15
|Sioux Falls, South Dakota, United States
|
|-
|Win
|align=center|7–0
|Dan Moret
|Decision (unanimous)
|RFA 13
|
|align=center|3
|align=center|5:00
|Lincoln, Nebraska, United States
|
|-
|Win
|align=center|6–0
|Zach Underwood
|TKO (punches)
|XFC 26: Night of Champions 3
|
|align=center|2
|align=center|3:38
|Nashville, Tennessee, United States
|
|-
|Win
|align=center|5–0
|Javon Wright
|Decision (split)
|Rhino Fighting Championships 7
|
|align=center|3
|align=center|5:00
|Spring Hill, Tennessee, United States
|
|-
|Win
|align=center|4–0
|Zachary Sanders	
|TKO (punches and elbows)
|XFC 18: Music City Mayhem
|
|align=center|1
|align=center|4:53
|Nashville, Tennessee, United States
|
|-
|Win
|align=center|3–0
|J.R. Hines
|TKO (punches)
|Gameness FC 10
|
|align=center|1
|align=center|2:08
|Goodlettsville, Tennessee, United States
|
|-
|Win
|align=center|2–0
|Latral Perdue
|Submission 
|Gameness FC 9
|
|align=center|1
|align=center|1:07
|Goodlettsville, Tennessee, United States
|
|-
|Win
|align=center|1–0
|Josh Jarvis
|TKO (punches)
|Strikeforce Challengers: Woodley vs. Saffiedine
|
|align=center|1
|align=center|3:15
|Nashville, Tennessee, United States
|

See also

 List of male mixed martial artists

References

External links
 
 

Living people
American male mixed martial artists
Bantamweight mixed martial artists
Mixed martial artists utilizing wrestling
Mixed martial artists utilizing boxing
Mixed martial artists from Tennessee
People from Clarksville, Tennessee
1985 births
People from Brenham, Texas
Sportspeople from Nashville, Tennessee
Ultimate Fighting Championship male fighters
American male boxers
American male sport wrestlers